Giovanni Battista Chiappe (1723–1765) was an Italian painter of the late-Baroque period, active mainly in Milan and Genoa. He was born in Novi, Italy and trained in Rome with a Genovese, Giuseppe Paravagna. In Alessandria, he painted a canvas of San Iganzio for the church of the same name.

References

1723 births
1765 deaths
18th-century Italian painters
Italian male painters
Italian Baroque painters
18th-century Italian male artists